Michael S. Feld (November 11, 1940 – April 10, 2010) was an American physicist, who was best known for his work on quantum optics, and medical applications of lasers.

Biography

Michael S. Feld received his Ph.D.MIT under the supervision of laser pioneer Ali Javan. He remained at MIT throughout his career, where he became a faculty member from 1968 to 1976: He was the director of the MIT George R. Harrison Spectroscopy Laboratory.

Also, he was well known in the field of quantum optics for his first observation of optical superradiance. He is credited for the experimental demonstrations of cavity, cavity-suppressed spontaneous emission, and the experimental demonstration of the first single-atom laser. In the later part of his career, he turned his attention to the field of biomedical optics, where he developed methods for in-tissue spectroscopy and imaging. Feld, also directed the Laser Biomedical Research Center at MIT, where he worked on fluorescence and Raman spectroscopy to measure in-vivo levels of biomarker molecules that assisted in the imaging of disease-causing microorganisms via endoscopy and optical tomography.

Prof. Feld strongly valued a scientific environment without ethnic or cultural prejudice, and many of his co-workers and Ph.D. students were from minority groups. Notably, he was the Ph.D. advisor of astronaut Ronald McNair, who died in the Challenger disaster.

Honors and awards
2008 William F. Meggers Award in Spectroscopy

Bibliography
 
  MIT News: "Michael S. Feld, physics professor, dies at age 69"

Notes
In 2012, the Optical Society established the Michael S. Feld Biophotonics Award which recognizes individuals for their innovative and influential contributions to the field of biophotonics; regardless of their career stage.  The award was first presented in 2013 to Brian C. Wilson.  A list of recipients can be found online at  https://www.osa.org/en-us/awards_and_grants/awards/award_description/michaelsfeld/

References

American physicists
Experimental physicists
1940 births
Place of birth missing
2010 deaths
Optical physicists
Laser researchers